Minnamurra is a single-platform intercity train station located in Minnamurra, New South Wales, Australia, on the South Coast railway line. The station serves NSW TrainLink trains traveling south to Kiama and north to Wollongong and Sydney.

While the railway line through Minnamurra opened in 1887, the station didn't open until four years later. In 1943, it moved to its present location. The station has no platform building and is not staffed. Electric multiple unit trains began to service the station from November 2001.

Despite some interest from local politicians, a perennial proposal to close Minnamurra and Bombo stations in favour of a new stop in the centre of Kiama Downs has not progressed.

Platforms & Services

References

External links

Minnamurra station details Transport for New South Wales

Easy Access railway stations in New South Wales
Railway stations in Australia opened in 1891
Regional railway stations in New South Wales